Ronald John Beresford Irwin,  (1 August 1880 – 8 July 1930) was the first Archdeacon of Dorking, serving two years until his death aged 49.

Life and career
Born on 1 August 1880, Irwin was educated at Winchester College and Keble College, Oxford. He was ordained in 1905 and was a chaplain in India from 1909 to 1923 and a chaplain to the Forces during World War I achieving the DSO and MC (see above)  and Vicar of Lillington from 1922 to 1927.  By Order in Council, a second Archdeaconry was added to the Diocese of Guildford on 17 August 1928 leading to a brief tenure in this new post as Irwin died on 8 July 1930 in the Brighton Registration District of the neighbouring county of Sussex aged 49.

References

1880 births
People educated at Winchester College
Alumni of Keble College, Oxford
World War I chaplains
Companions of the Distinguished Service Order
Recipients of the Military Cross
Archdeacons of Dorking
1930 deaths